Stephen Ian Lopez Veneracion (born February 7, 1975) is a Filipino athlete, actor, pilot, and singer.

Personal life and career
His father is renowned painter Roy Veneracion, while his mother is Susan Lopez-Veneracion. He grew up in Manila but spent many of his childhood summers in Liloan, Cebu where his mother originally came from. He is married to Pam (née Gallardo), an industrial engineer, with whom he has three children. Primarily known as an action star, he regained fame in 2015 due to the popularity of his loveteam with Jodi Sta. Maria.

His career started in 1982 as first appeared in RPN 9's show, Joey and Son. in 1986, Veneracion joined GMA Network's That's Entertainment, hosted by German Moreno. Throughout the 1990s, he starred in several action films. Veneracion's first drama appearance is Ikaw Lang Ang Mamahalin since 2001. He later transferred to ABS-CBN in 2003, and had his first main role in Darating ang Umaga. In 2004, Veneracion returned to GMA Network and appeared in several shows. He once again moved to ABS-CBN in 2007, and returned to GMA Network in 2008. He also appeared in two shows of Robin Padilla, Joaquin Bordado and Totoy Bato. Veneracion transferred from GMA Network to ABS-CBN and is currently a talent of Star Magic in 2011. He popularly appeared in the remake of 2000 drama, Pangako Sa' Yo, starring Kathryn Bernardo and Daniel Padilla since 2015. He appeared in the film directed by Antoinette Jadaone, The Achy Breaky Hearts, in a main role with Jodi Sta. Maria and Richard Yap in 2016. In 2017, he appeared in the drama, A Love to Last, with Bea Alonzo and Iza Calzado.

Interests
Veneracion is an equipment engineer known to be an avid outdoorsman. He is a licensed private pilot, skydiver, paragliding pilot and scuba diver. He also engages in various outdoor activities such as trail riding, climbing, sailing and recreational fishing.

Veneracion was a rider for the Shell-Yamaha motocross racing team between 2004 and 2006.

Filmography

Television

Films

Concert tours

Solo major concerts

Discography

Songs

Awards

References

External links

1975 births
Living people
ABS-CBN personalities
Filipino male comedians
Filipino male child actors
Filipino male film actors
Filipino male television actors
Filipino people of Spanish descent
GMA Network personalities
Male actors from Manila
That's Entertainment Monday Group Members
That's Entertainment (Philippine TV series)
TV5 (Philippine TV network) personalities